Thomas Andrew Lehrer (born April 9, 1928) is an American musician, singer-songwriter, satirist, and mathematician, who later taught mathematics and musical theater. He recorded pithy and humorous songs that became popular in the 1950s and 1960s. His songs often parodied popular musical forms, though they usually had original melodies. An exception is "The Elements", in which he set the names of the chemical elements to the tune of the "Major-General's Song" from Gilbert and Sullivan's Pirates of Penzance.

Lehrer's early performances dealt with non-topical subjects and black humor in songs such as "Poisoning Pigeons in the Park". In the 1960s, he produced songs about timely social and political issues, particularly for the U.S. version of the television show That Was the Week That Was. The popularity of these songs has far outlasted their topical subjects and references. Lehrer quoted a friend's explanation: "Always predict the worst and you'll be hailed as a prophet." In the early 1970s, Lehrer largely retired from public performance to devote his time to teaching mathematics and musical theater history at the University of California, Santa Cruz.

Early life

Thomas Andrew Lehrer was born on April 9, 1928, to a secular Jewish family and grew up on Manhattan's Upper East Side. He is the son of Morris James Lehrer and Anna Lehrer (née Waller). He began studying classical piano at the age of seven, but was more interested in the popular music of the age. Eventually, his mother also sent him to a popular-music piano teacher. At this early age, he began writing show tunes, which eventually helped him as a satirical composer and writer in his years of lecturing at Harvard University and later at other universities.

Lehrer attended the Horace Mann School in Riverdale, New York, part of the Bronx. He also attended Camp Androscoggin, both as a camper and a counselor. Lehrer was considered a child prodigy and entered Harvard College, where one of his professors was Irving Kaplansky, at the age of 15 after graduating from Loomis School. As a mathematics undergraduate student at Harvard College, he began to write comic songs to entertain his friends, including "Fight Fiercely, Harvard" (1945). Those songs were later named collectively The Physical Revue, a joking reference to a leading scientific journal, the Physical Review.

Academic and military career

Lehrer graduated Bachelor of Arts in mathematics from Harvard University, magna cum laude, in 1946. At Harvard, he was the roommate of the Canadian theologian Robert Crouse. He received his AM degree the next year and was inducted into Phi Beta Kappa.  He later taught mathematics and other classes at MIT, Harvard, Wellesley, and the University of California, Santa Cruz.
Lehrer remained in Harvard's doctoral program for several years, taking time out for his musical career and to work as a researcher at the Los Alamos Scientific Laboratory.

Lehrer was drafted into the U.S. Army from 1955 to 1957, working at the National Security Agency (NSA). Lehrer has stated that he invented the Jello shot during this time, as a means of circumventing a naval base's ban on alcoholic beverages. 
Despite holding a master's degree in an era when American conscripts often lacked a high school diploma, Lehrer served as an enlisted soldier, achieving the rank of Specialist Third Class, which he described as being a "corporal without portfolio". These experiences became fodder for songs, such as "The Wild West is Where I Want to Be" and "It Makes a Fellow Proud to Be a Soldier". In 2020 Lehrer publicly revealed that he had been assigned to the NSA; since the mere fact of the NSA's existence was classified at the time, Lehrer found himself in the position of implicitly using nuclear weapons work as a cover story for something more sensitive.

In 1960, Lehrer returned to full-time math studies at Harvard.

From 1962, Lehrer taught in the political science department at the Massachusetts Institute of Technology (MIT). In 1965 he gave up on his mathematics dissertation on modes in statistics, after having worked on it intermittently for 15 years.

In 1972, Lehrer joined the faculty of the University of California, Santa Cruz, teaching an introductory course entitled The Nature of Mathematics to liberal arts majors—"math for tenors", according to Lehrer. He also taught a class in musical theater. He occasionally performed songs in his lectures.

In 2001, Lehrer taught his last mathematics class, on the topic of infinity, and retired from academia. He has remained in the area, and in 2003 said he still "hangs out" around the University of California, Santa Cruz.

Publications
The American Mathematical Society database lists him as co-author of two papers:

 
 
Two of Lehrer's songs were reprinted, with his permission, in Mad magazine:

 Tom Lehrer Sings "The Wild West is Where I Want To Be" (illustrated by George Woodbridge, MAD #32, April 1957)
 Tom Lehrer's "The Hunting Song" (illustrated by George Woodbridge, MAD #35, October 1957)

Musical career

Style and influences

Lehrer was mainly influenced by musical theater. According to Gerald Nachman's book Seriously Funny, the Broadway musical Let's Face It!  made an early and lasting impression on him. Lehrer's style consists of parodying various forms of popular song. For example, his appreciation of list songs led him to write "The Elements", which lists the chemical elements to the tune of Gilbert and Sullivan's "Major-General's Song".

In author and Boston University professor Isaac Asimov's second autobiographical volume, In Joy Still Felt, Asimov recounted seeing Lehrer perform in a Boston nightclub on October 9, 1954. Lehrer sang a song about Jim getting it from Louise, and Sally from Jim, "...and after a while you gathered the 'it' was venereal disease. [The song was likely "I Got It From Agnes".] Suddenly, as the combinations grew more grotesque, you realized he was satirizing every known perversion without using a single naughty phrase. It was clearly unsingable outside a nightclub." Asimov also recalled a song that dealt with the Boston subway system, making use of the stations leading into town from Harvard, observing that the local subject-matter rendered the song useless for general distribution. Lehrer subsequently granted Asimov permission to print the lyrics to the subway song in his book. "I haven't gone to nightclubs often," said Asimov, "but of all the times I have gone, it was on this occasion that I had by far the best time."

Recordings

Lehrer was encouraged by the success of his performances, so he paid $15 for some studio time in 1953 to record Songs by Tom Lehrer. The initial pressing was 400 copies. Radio stations would not air his songs because of his controversial subjects, so he sold the album on campus at Harvard for $3, while "several stores near the Harvard campus sold it for $3.50, taking only a minimal markup as a kind of community service. Newsstands on campus sold it for the same price." After one summer, he started to receive mail orders from all parts of the country, as far away as San Francisco, after the San Francisco Chronicle wrote an article on the record. Interest in his recordings spread by word of mouth. People played their records for friends, who then also wanted a copy.  Lehrer recalled, "Lacking exposure in the media, my songs spread slowly. Like herpes, rather than ebola."

The album included the macabre "I Hold Your Hand in Mine", the mildly risqué "Be Prepared", and "Lobachevsky" regarding plagiarizing mathematicians. It became a cult success by word of mouth, despite being self-published and without promotion. Lehrer embarked on a series of concert tours and recorded a second album in 1959. He released the second album in two versions: the songs were the same, but More of Tom Lehrer was a studio recording and An Evening Wasted with Tom Lehrer was recorded live in concert.  In 2013, Lehrer recalled the studio session for "Poisoning Pigeons in the Park", which referred to the practice of controlling pigeons in Boston with strychnine-treated corn:

Touring

Lehrer had a breakthrough in the United Kingdom on December 4, 1957, when the University of London awarded a doctor of music degree honoris causa to Princess Margaret, and the public orator, Professor J. R. Sutherland, said it was "in the full knowledge that the Princess is a connoisseur of music and a performer of skill and distinction, her taste being catholic, ranging from Mozart to the calypso and from opera to the songs of Miss Beatrice Lillie and Tom Lehrer." This prompted significant interest in Lehrer's works and helped to secure distribution for his five-year-old debut album in Britain. It was there that his music achieved real sales popularity, as a result of the proliferation of university newspapers referring to the material, and inadvertently due to the BBC, which in 1958 banned from broadcast 10 of the 12 songs on the album. By the end of the 1950s, Lehrer had sold 370,000 records.

That Was The Week That Was
In 1960, Lehrer essentially retired from touring in the U.S. The same year, he toured Australia and New Zealand, performing a total of 33 concerts to great acclaim and controversy. While in New Zealand, Lehrer wrote a song criticizing the All Blacks rugby team 1960 tour of apartheid South Africa. These tours occurred during a time in which he was, he said, "banned, censored, mentioned in several houses of parliament and threatened with arrest". In particular, "Be Prepared" drew advance resistance in Brisbane from the commissioner of police. He performed several unreleased songs in Australia, including "The Masochism Tango". In the early 1960s, he was employed as the resident songwriter for the U.S. edition of That Was The Week That Was (TW3), a satirical television show.

A greater proportion of his output became overtly political, or at least topical, on subjects such as education ("New Math"), the Second Vatican Council ("The Vatican Rag", a tune based on the 1910 "Spaghetti Rag" by Lyons and Yosco), race relations ("National Brotherhood Week"), air and water pollution ("Pollution"), American militarism ("Send the Marines"),  and nuclear proliferation ("Who's Next?" and "MLF Lullaby"). He also wrote a song satirizing rocket scientist Wernher von Braun, who worked for Nazi Germany before working for the United States. Lehrer did not appear on the television show; vocalist Nancy Ames performed his songs (to Lehrer's chagrin), and network censors often altered his lyrics. Lehrer later performed these songs on the album That Was The Year That Was (1965) at which point people could hear them the way that he intended.

In 1966, BBC TV host David Frost invited him to contribute some of his classic compositions to his BBC program The Frost Report. The show was transmitted live, and he pre-recorded all his segments at one performance. Lehrer was not featured in every edition, but his songs featured in an appropriate part of each show. At least two of his songs were not included on any of his LPs: a reworking of Noël Coward's "That is the End of the News" (with some new lyrics) and a comic explanation of how Britain might adapt to the coming of decimal currency. The record deal with Reprise Records for That Was The Year That Was also gave Reprise distribution rights for his earlier recordings, as Lehrer wanted to wind up his own record imprint. The Reprise issue of Songs by Tom Lehrer was a stereo re-recording. This version was not issued on CD, but the songs were issued on the live Tom Lehrer Revisited CD. The live recording included bonus tracks "L-Y" and "Silent E", two of the ten songs that he wrote for the PBS children's educational series The Electric Company. Lehrer later commented that worldwide sales of the recordings under Reprise surpassed 1.8 million units in 1996. That same year, That Was The Year That Was went gold.  The album liner notes promote his songs with self-deprecating humor, such as quoting a New York Times review from 1959: Mr. Lehrer's muse is "not fettered by such inhibiting factors as taste."

Lehrer made a short tour in Norway and Denmark in 1967, performing some of the songs from the television program. His performance in Oslo on September 10 was recorded on video tape and aired locally that autumn, then released on DVD some 40 years later. He performed as a prominent international guest at the Studenterforeningen (student association) in Copenhagen, which was televised, and he commented on stage that he might be America's "revenge for Victor Borge". He performed original songs in a Dodge automobile industrial film distributed primarily to automobile dealers and shown at promotional events in 1967, set in a fictional American wild west town and titled The Dodge Rebellion Theatre presents Ballads For '67. He attempted to adapt Sweeney Todd as a Broadway musical, working with Joe Raposo, to star Jerry Colonna. They started a few songs but, as Lehrer noted, "Nothing ever came of it, and of course twenty years later Stephen Sondheim beat me to the punch."

Departure from the music scene

In the 1970s, Lehrer concentrated on teaching mathematics and musical theater, although he also wrote ten songs for the educational children's television show The Electric Company. His last public performance for many years took place in 1972, on a fundraising tour for Democratic US presidential candidate George McGovern.

When asked about his reasons for abandoning his musical career in an interview in the book accompanying his CD boxed set, released in 2000, Lehrer cited a lack of interest, a disdain of touring, and the monotony of performing the same songs repeatedly.  He observed that when he was moved to write and perform songs, he did and, when he was not, he did not, and that after a while he simply lost interest. Even though Lehrer was "a hero of the anti-nuclear, civil rights left" and covered its political issues in many of his songs and, even though he shared the New Left's opposition to the Vietnam War, and advocated for civil rights, he disliked the aesthetics of the counterculture of the 1960s and stopped performing as the movement gained momentum.

Lehrer's musical career was relatively brief.  He once mentioned that he performed a mere 109 shows and wrote 37 songs over 20 years.  Nevertheless, he developed a significant following in the United States and abroad.

Revivals and reissues

Lehrer's music became a staple of the Doctor Demento Show when it began national syndication in 1977.
In 1980, Cameron Mackintosh produced Tomfoolery, a revue of Lehrer's songs that was a hit on the London stage. Lehrer was not initially involved with the show, but he was pleased with it; he eventually gave the stage production his full support and updated several of his lyrics for the show. Tomfoolery contained 27 songs and led to more than 200 productions, including an Off-Broadway production at the Village Gate which ran for 120 performances in 1981. Lehrer made a rare TV appearance on BBC's Parkinson show in conjunction with the Tom Foolery premiere in 1980 at the Criterion Theatre in London, where he sang "I Got It from Agnes". There were "Tomfoolery" performances in San Francisco about 1982 and in 2018–19. In 1993, he wrote "That's Mathematics" for the closing credits to a Mathematical Sciences Research Institute video celebrating the proof of Fermat's Last Theorem.

On June 7 and 8, 1998, Lehrer performed in public for the first time in 25 years at the Lyceum Theatre, London as part of the show Hey, Mr. Producer! celebrating the career of Cameron Mackintosh, who had produced Tom Foolery. The June 8 show was his only performance before Queen Elizabeth II. Lehrer sang "Poisoning Pigeons in the Park" and an updated version of the nuclear proliferation song "Who's Next?"

In 2000, Lehrer commented that he doubted his songs had any real effect on those not already critical of the establishment: "I don't think this kind of thing has an impact on the unconverted, frankly. It's not even preaching to the converted; it's titillating the converted ... I'm fond of quoting Peter Cook, who talked about the satirical Berlin Kabaretts of the 1930s, which did so much to stop the rise of Hitler and prevent the Second World War."

Lehrer has said, jokingly, of his musical career: "If, after hearing my songs, just one human being is inspired to say something nasty to a friend, or perhaps to strike a loved one, it will all have been worth the while."
In 2003, Lehrer commented that his particular brand of political satire is more difficult in the modern world: "The real issues I don't think most people touch. The Clinton jokes are all about Monica Lewinsky and all that stuff and not about the important things, like the fact that he wouldn't ban land mines ... I'm not tempted to write a song about George W. Bush. I couldn't figure out what sort of song I would write. That's the problem: I don't want to satirize George Bush and his puppeteers, I want to vaporize them."

In 2000, the boxed CD set The Remains of Tom Lehrer was released by Rhino Entertainment. It included live and studio versions of his first two albums, That Was The Year That Was, the songs that he wrote for The Electric Company, and some previously unreleased material, a small hardbound lyrics book with an introduction by Dr. Demento. In 2010, Shout! Factory launched a reissue campaign, making Lehrer's out-of-print albums available digitally. The CD/DVD combo The Tom Lehrer Collection was also issued, including his best-known songs, with a DVD featuring an Oslo concert.

In a February 2008 phone call, Gene Weingarten of The Washington Post interviewed Lehrer off the record. When Weingarten asked if there was anything he could print for the record, Lehrer responded "Just tell the people that I am voting for Obama."

In 2012 rapper 2 Chainz sampled Lehrer's song "The Old Dope Peddler", on his 2012 debut album, Based on a T.R.U. Story. In 2013, Lehrer said he was "very proud" to have his song sampled "literally sixty years after I recorded it".  Lehrer went on to describe his official response to the request to use his song: "As sole copyright owner of 'The Old Dope Peddler', I grant you motherfuckers permission to do this. Please give my regards to Mr. Chainz, or may I call him 2?"

Released discography into public domain 
In 2020, at the age of 92, Lehrer donated all of his lyrics and music written by him to the public domain. He followed this on November 1, 2022 with all recording and performing rights of any kind, making all of his music that he has originally composed or performed free for anyone to use and available directly from his site for free download. His statement releasing all his works into the public domain concludes with this note: "This website will be shut down at some date in the not too distant future, so if you want to download anything, don't wait too long."

Musical legacy
In 1967, Swedish actor Lars Ekborg, known outside Sweden for his part in Ingmar Bergman’s Summer with Monika, made an album called I Tom Lehrers vackra värld ("In the beautiful world of Tom Lehrer"), with 12 of Lehrer's songs interpreted in Swedish. Lehrer wrote in a letter to the producer Per-Anders Boquist that, "Not knowing any Swedish, I am obviously not equipped to judge, but it sounds to me as though Mr. Ekborg is perfect for the songs," along with further compliments to pianist Leif Asp for unexpected additional flourishes.

In 1971, Argentinian singer Nacha Guevara sang Spanish versions of several Lehrer songs for the show/live album Este es el año que es.

Composer Randy Newman said of Lehrer, "He's one of the great American songwriters without a doubt, right up there with everybody, the top guys. As a lyricist, as good as there's been in the last half of the 20th century." Singer and comedian Dillie Keane has acknowledged Lehrer's influence on her work.

Dr. Demento praised Lehrer as "the best musical satirist of the twentieth century." Other artists who cite Lehrer as an influence include "Weird Al" Yankovic, whose work generally addresses more popular and less technical or political subjects, and educator and scientist H. Paul Shuch, who tours under the stage name Dr. SETI, and calls himself "a cross between Carl Sagan and Tom Lehrer: He sings like Sagan and lectures like Lehrer." Yankovic saw Daniel Radcliffe (who called Lehrer his "hero") perform "The Elements" on The Graham Norton Show, which led to Radcliffe starring in Weird: The Al Yankovic Story.

In 2004, British medical satirists Amateur Transplants acknowledged the debt they owe to Lehrer on the back of their first album, Fitness to Practice.  Their song "The Menstrual Rag" uses the tune of Lehrer's "The Vatican Rag"; and "The Drugs Song" mirrors Lehrer's song "The Elements", both using the tune of the "Major-General's Song" from The Pirates of Penzance by Gilbert and Sullivan.  The Amateur Transplants' second album, Unfit to Practise, opens with an update of Lehrer's "The Masochism Tango" called "Masochism Tango 2008".

From January 16 to February 25, 2006, the play Letters from Lehrer, written and performed by Canadian Richard Greenblatt, ran at CanStage in Toronto. It followed Lehrer's musical career, the meaning of several songs, the politics of the time, and Greenblatt's own experiences with Lehrer's music, while playing some of Lehrer's songs.

In 2010, the German musician-comedian Felix Janosa released an album with the title "Tauben vergiften: Die bösen Lieder von Tom Lehrer" ("Poisoning pigeons: The Evil Songs of Tom Lehrer"), with German versions of some of his best-known songs.

Performers influenced by Lehrer's style include American political satirist Mark Russell, Canadian comedian and songwriter Randy Vancourt, and the British duo Kit and The Widow.

Discography
Studio albums
 Songs by Tom Lehrer (1953), re-recorded in 1966
 More of Tom Lehrer (1959)

Live albums
 An Evening Wasted with Tom Lehrer (1959)
 Revisited (1960)
 Tom Lehrer Discovers Australia (And Vice Versa) (1960; Australia-only)
 That Was the Year That Was (1965)

 Compilation albums
 Tom Lehrer in Concert (1994; UK compilation)
 Songs & More Songs by Tom Lehrer (1997; US compilation of his first two studio albums with additional songs)
 The Remains of Tom Lehrer (2000)
 The Tom Lehrer Collection (2010)

Many of Lehrer's songs are performed by others in That Was The Week That Was (Radiola LP, 1981).

The sheet music of many songs is published in The Tom Lehrer Song Book (Crown Publishers Inc., 1954; Library of Congress Card Catalog Number 54-12068) and Too Many Songs by Tom Lehrer: With Not Enough Drawings by Ronald Searle (Pantheon, 1981, ; Methuen, 1999). A second song book, Tom Lehrer's Second Song Book, is out of print, .

References

External links

 
  (Songs) 
  
 
 
 
 
 Tom Lehrer and The Topp Twins - ABC Radio National  (podcast). Interview. Conversation recorded in 2000, re-broadcast in 2021
 

1928 births
20th-century American comedians
20th-century American male musicians
20th-century American mathematicians
20th-century American pianists
21st-century American male musicians
21st-century American pianists
American agnostics
American comedy musicians
American lyricists
American male non-fiction writers
American male pianists
American male singer-songwriters
American novelty song performers
American parodists
American satirists
Harvard College alumni
Horace Mann School alumni
Jewish agnostics
Jewish American male comedians
Jewish American musicians
Jewish American songwriters
Living people
Loomis Chaffee School alumni
Mathematicians from New York (state)
MIT School of Humanities, Arts, and Social Sciences faculty
National Security Agency people
Parody musicians
People from the Upper East Side
Reprise Records artists
Singer-songwriters from New York (state)
Singers from New York City
United States Army soldiers
University of California, Santa Cruz faculty
Wellesley College faculty